Eucalyptus fastigata, commonly known as brown barrel or cut-tail, is a species of medium-sized to tall tree that is endemic to southeastern Australia. It has fibrous or stringy bark on the trunk and larger branches, smooth bark above, lance-shaped to curved adult leaves, flower buds in groups of eleven or more, white flowers and conical or pair-shaped fruit.

Description
Eucalyptus fastigata is typically a tall, straight tree that grows to a height of  but does not form a lignotuber. It has rough, fibrous or stringy bark on the trunk and larger branches, smooth white to brown bark above which often hangs in strings in the crown. Flowering occurs between December and February and the flowers are white.

Eucalyptus regnans is similar to E. fastigata but has rough bark only at the base of the trunk, smaller buds and fruit, and a wider distribution in Victoria.

Taxonomy and naming
Eucalyptus fastigata was first formally described in 1897 by Henry Deane and Joseph Maiden in Proceedings of the Linnean Society of New South Wales. The specific epithet is from the Latin word (fastigatus) meaning "bring to a point" or "sharpen".

Distribution and habitat
Brown barrel grows in tall open forest in valleys and on slopes between the Ebor district on the Northern Tablelands of New South Wales to the Errinundra Plateau in far north-eastern Victoria.
It is widely planted in New Zealand.

References

fastigata
Myrtales of Australia
Flora of New South Wales
Flora of Victoria (Australia)
Trees of Australia
Trees of mild maritime climate
Plants described in 1897
Taxa named by Henry Deane (engineer)
Taxa named by Joseph Maiden